Hurry Sundown is the third studio album by American country music band McBride & the Ride. Released in 1993 on MCA Records, it produced the hit singles "Love on the Loose, Heart on the Run" and the title track, which peaked at #3 and #17, respectively, on the Billboard Hot Country Singles & Tracks (now Hot Country Songs) charts.

The track "Hangin' in and Hangin' On" was later recorded by David Ball on his 1996 album Starlite Lounge, from which it was released as a single. "Sweetwater" was later recorded by Greg Holland on his 1994 debut album Let Me Drive, and by Aaron Tippin on his 1998 album What This Country Needs.

Track listing

Chart performance

References

1993 albums
MCA Records albums
McBride & the Ride albums
Albums produced by Tony Brown (record producer)